Mechanical may refer to:

Machine
 Machine (mechanical), a system of mechanisms that shape the actuator input to achieve a specific application of output forces and movement
 Mechanical calculator, a device used to perform the basic operations of arithmetic
 Mechanical energy, the sum of potential energy and kinetic energy
 Mechanical system, a system that manages the power of forces and movements to accomplish a task
 Mechanism (engineering), a portion of a mechanical device

Other
 Mechanical (character), one of several characters in Shakespeare's A Midsummer Night's Dream
 A kind of typeface in the VOX-ATypI classification

See also
 Machine, especially in opposition to an electronic item
 Mechanical Animals, the third full-length studio release by Marilyn Manson
 Manufactured or artificial, especially in opposition to a biological or natural component
 Automation, using machine decisions and processing instead of human
 Mechanization, using machine labor instead of human or animal labor
 Mechanical watch, utilizing a non-electric mechanism
 Mechanical engineering, a branch of engineering concerned with the application of physical mechanics
 HVAC (heating, ventilation, and air-conditioning), the mechanical systems of a building
 Mechanical phenomenon, as in the mechanics of the Digestive Tract or the mechanics of swallowing 
 Mechanical license, used in the music industry to indicate the payment made from a licensee to the owner of a copyright for the right to mechanically reproduce a song
 Mechanic (disambiguation)
 Mechanics